Barreiros (Barriers) is a municipality in Pernambuco with 42,764 inhabitants.

Geography
 State - Pernambuco
 Region - Zona da mata Pernambucana
 Boundaries - Tamandaré (N); Alagoas state and São José da Coroa Grande (S); Água Preta (W); Atlantic Ocean (E)
 Area - 233.37 km2
 Elevation - 22m
 Vegetation - Forest Subperenifólia
 Clima - Hot tropical and humid
 Annual average temperature - 24.9C
 Distance to Recife - 106 km

Beaches

Economy
The main economic activities in Barreiros are based in commerce, tourism and agribusiness. Especially coconuts, manioc, sugarcane, bananas; and creations of cattle and buffalos.

Economic indicators

Economy by sector
2006

Health indicators

Notable people
Irandhir Santos, actor

References

Populated coastal places in Pernambuco
Municipalities in Pernambuco